Miltochrista is a genus of moths of the family Erebidae, subfamily Arctiinae. The genus was erected by Jacob Hübner in 1819.

Description
Palpi short and porrect (extending forward). Antennae with long cilia in male and bipectinated, and minute cilia in female. Tibia with short spurs. Forewings with vein 5 from just above lower angle of cell, vein 6 from upper angle or stalked with veins 7,8 and 9. Vein 10 from close to the angle of cell or before cell. Vein 11 from one-half to three-fourths length of cell and straight, or curved and running close along vein 12 or anastomosing with 12. Hindwings with vein 5 on a short stalk with vein 4, or from a point with it, or from above angle. Veins 6 and 7 stalked and vein 8 from near end of cell.

Species
 Miltochrista aberrans Butler, 1877
 Miltochrista apuncta Rothschild, 1915
 Miltochrista asakurai (Matsumura, 1927)
 Miltochrista bivittata Butler, 1885
 Miltochrista calamina Butler, 1877
 Miltochrista cardinalis Hampson, 1900
 Miltochrista coccinea (Moore, 1886)
 Miltochrista convexa Wileman
 Miltochrista curtisi Butler, 1881
 Miltochrista decussata Moore, 1877
 Miltochrista delicata (Moore, 1878)
 Miltochrista delicia (Swinhoe, 1891)
 Miltochrista delineata (Walker, 1854)
 Miltochrista dentifascia Hampson, 1894
 Miltochrista duopunctata Semper, 1899
 Miltochrista eccentropis Meyrick, 1894
 Miltochrista effasciata (Felder, 1861)
 Miltochrista expressa Inoue, 1988
 Miltochrista fasciata Leech, 1899
 Miltochrista flexuosa Leech, 1899
 Miltochrista gratiosa (Guérin-Méneville, 1843)
 Miltochrista hololeuca Hampson, 1895
 Miltochrista indica (Moore, 1879)
 Miltochrista inflexa (Moore, 1878)
 Miltochrista inscripta (Walker, 1854)
 Miltochrista linga (Moore, [1860])
 Miltochrista maculifasciata Hampson, 1894
 Miltochrista magna Hampson, 1894
 Miltochrista mesortha Hampson, 1898
 Miltochrista miniata Forster, 1771
 Miltochrista multidentata Hampson, 1900
 Miltochrista multistriata Hampson, 1894
 Miltochrista nigralba Hampson, 1894
 Miltochrista obscura Semper, 1899
 Miltochrista pallida (Bremer, 1864)
 Miltochrista phaeoxanthia Hampson, 1900
 Miltochrista plumbilineata Hampson, 1900
 Miltochrista postnigra Hampson, 1894
 Miltochrista proleuca Hampson, 1900
 Miltochrista prominens (Moore, 1878)
 Miltochrista pulchra Butler, 1877
 Miltochrista punicea (Moore, 1878)
 Miltochrista radians (Moore, 1878)
 Miltochrista rosacea (Bremer, 1861)
 Miltochrista rosaria Butler, 1877
 Miltochrista sanguinea (Moore, 1877)
 Miltochrista simplicior (Matsumura, 1927)
 Miltochrista spilosomoides (Moore, 1878)
 Miltochrista striata (Bremer & Grey, 1852)
 Miltochrista strigivenata Hampson, 1894
 Miltochrista terminifusca Daniel, 1955
 Miltochrista wenchiyehi (Wu, Fu & Chang, 2013)
 Miltochrista yimingcheni (Wu, Fu & Chang, 2013)
 Miltochrista yueh Wu & Kishida, 2020
 Miltochrista zebrina (Moore, 1878)
 Miltochrista ziczac (Walker, 1856)

Former species
 Miltochrista rivulosa (Walker, 1854)

References

 
Nudariina
Moth genera